Miccosukee Casino & Resort is a 9-story resort and casino located in the western outskirts of Miami, Florida on the edge of the Everglades. It has a colored statue of a young Miccosukee boy outside the front entrance. It has been quoted to be "one of the most unusual resort destinations in Florida" due to the contrast between the Native American village surroundings and the casino. Established in 1999 at a reported cost of $45 million, it is operated by about 400 members of the Miccosukee Tribe. In, 2009 it was estimated that the Miccosukee Resort generated revenue of around $75 million a year.

Facilities 

The resort has 256 guest rooms and 56 suites. Guest facilities include a pool, fitness center, sauna, jacuzzi, casino, conference center, and banquet facilities. The casino includes slot machines and a poker section where it regularly hosts poker tournaments.

Dining 
There are five dining locations:

 Empeek-Cheke - Upscale dining (Miccosukee's signature restaurant) 
 Empeeke Aaweeke's International Buffet - Serving breakfast, lunch, and dinner 
 The Empeek Aya deli - Open 24 hours 
 Café Hammock - Open 24 hours
 The Bingo Snack Bar - A convenience stand 

On Sundays the resort and gaming casino also hosts a Sunday Brunch.

Other 
The Miccosukee Golf and Country Club is also located nearby. On September 29, 2011, Miccosukee Resort, along with Romance 106.7FM, Budweiser, 411 pain  and Walgreens, organized a Latin music concert in Miami named "Una Copa con Romance", attended by some 1500 people and artists such as Charlie Zaa. The resort is a setting in the 2010 Jonathan King novel Acts of Nature.

See also
List of casinos in Florida

References

External links
Official site

Hotels in Miami
Casinos in Florida
Casinos completed in 1999
Hotel buildings completed in 1999
Hotels established in 1999
Casino hotels
Native American casinos
1999 establishments in Florida
Native American history of Florida
Miccosukee